Mehdi Fahim Abdul Al-Sada (born 20 December 1955) is an Iraqi sprinter. He competed in the men's 4 × 400 metres relay at the 1980 Summer Olympics.

References

External links
 

1955 births
Living people
Athletes (track and field) at the 1980 Summer Olympics
Iraqi male sprinters
Olympic athletes of Iraq
Place of birth missing (living people)
Asian Games medalists in athletics (track and field)
Asian Games silver medalists for Iraq
Asian Games bronze medalists for Iraq
Athletes (track and field) at the 1978 Asian Games
Athletes (track and field) at the 1986 Asian Games
Medalists at the 1978 Asian Games
Medalists at the 1986 Asian Games